Psalm 42 is the 42nd psalm of the Book of Psalms, often known in English by its incipit, "As the hart panteth after the water brooks" (in the King James Version). The Book of Psalms is part of the third section of the Hebrew Bible, and a book of the Christian Old Testament. In the Hebrew Bible, Psalm 42 opens the second of the five books (divisions) of Psalms, also known as the "Elohistic Psalter" because the word YHWH is rarely used and God is generally referred to as "Elohim".

In the slightly different numbering system used in the Greek Septuagint version of the bible, and generally in its Latin translations, this psalm is Psalm 41, although the Nova Vulgata translation follows the Hebrew numbering. The psalm is a hymn psalm. It is one of twelve psalms attributed to the sons of Korah.

In Latin, its incipit in the Psalterium Gallicanum (the version in the Roman Breviary until the optional introduction of the Versio Piana in 1945) is Quemadmodum desiderat cervus; but Sicut cervus in the Psalterium Romanum. It begins "As pants the hart" in the English metrical version by Tate and Brady (1696) and in Coverdale's translation in the Book of Common Prayer, "Like as the hart".

The psalm forms a regular part of Jewish, Catholic, Lutheran, Anglican and other Protestant liturgies and has often been set to music, notably in Palestrina's Sicut cervus, Handel's As pants the hart and Mendelssohn's Psalm 42.

Background and themes
While the psalm is attributed to the "sons of Korah", the text is written in the first person singular. The psalm can be divided into two parts, each ending with the same line (verses 6 and 12 in the Hebrew).

The psalmist bemoans all the troubles he has endured in his exile and prays for salvation. He laments his remoteness from the temple of God and expresses his desire for the renewal of the divine presence. Matthew Henry speculates that David might have composed this psalm when he was prevented from returning to the sanctuary in Jerusalem, either due to persecution by Saul or because of Absalom's revolt.

Some ancient Hebrew manuscripts have this Psalm combined with Psalm 43, and C. S. Rodd argues on account of "similarities of thought and language" that these two psalms were originally one.

Text

Hebrew Bible version
Following is the Hebrew text of Psalm 42:

King James Version
 As the hart panteth after the water brooks, so panteth my soul after thee, O God.
 My soul thirsteth for God, for the living God: when shall I come and appear before God?
 My tears have been my meat day and night, while they continually say unto me, Where is thy God?
 When I remember these things, I pour out my soul in me: for I had gone with the multitude, I went with them to the house of God, with the voice of joy and praise, with a multitude that kept holyday.
 Why art thou cast down, O my soul? and why art thou disquieted in me? hope thou in God: for I shall yet praise him for the help of his countenance.
 O my God, my soul is cast down within me: therefore will I remember thee from the land of Jordan, and of the Hermonites, from the hill Mizar.
 Deep calleth unto deep at the noise of thy waterspouts: all thy waves and thy billows are gone over me.
 Yet the LORD will command his lovingkindness in the daytime, and in the night his song shall be with me, and my prayer unto the God of my life.
 I will say unto God my rock, Why hast thou forgotten me? why go I mourning because of the oppression of the enemy?
 As with a sword in my bones, mine enemies reproach me; while they say daily unto me, Where is thy God?
 Why art thou cast down, O my soul? and why art thou disquieted within me? hope thou in God: for I shall yet praise him, who is the health of my countenance, and my God.

The interpretation of the psalm's opening has been disputed for centuries. Jonathan Nathan argues that the traditional translation ("As the hart panteth after the water brooks") is based on an ancient but unsupported guess about the meaning of the rare Hebrew word תַּעֲרֹג. A better interpretation might be: "As you [God] turn a deer towards streams of water, so do you turn my soul towards yourself".

Uses

Judaism 
Sephardi Jews recite Psalm 42 on the first and second nights of Sukkot prior to the evening prayer. Those who follow the custom of the Gra say Psalm 42 as the Song of the Day on the second day of Sukkot.

Verse 2 is said during Selichot.

Psalm 42 is one of the ten Psalms of the Tikkun HaKlali of Rebbe Nachman of Breslov.

This psalm is traditionally recited as a prayer for the end of the exile, and "to find favor in the eyes of others".

New Testament 
The Septuagint rendering of some words in verse 5 shows close resemblance to the words of Jesus during the Agony in the Garden as recorded in Matthew  or Mark . A part of the next verse in Greek also resembles what was spoken by Jesus during the same event, according to John .

Fathers of the Church 

In his discourse on this psalm, Saint Augustine of Hippo says that it corresponds to the longings of the Church.

Catholic Church 

In the Rule of St. Benedict (530) this psalm was the fourth of those assigned to the second nocturn of Monday matins. In the Roman Breviary promulgated by Pope Pius V in 1568, it is the fourth in Tuesday matins. In the 1911 Reform of the Roman Breviary by Pope Pius X, it appears, divided into two parts, in Tuesday sext. In the post-Vatican II Liturgy of the Hours it is the first psalm in lauds on the Monday of the second of the four weeks over which the psalter is spread. In the Roman Missal, the responsorial psalm sung after a reading is several times composed of verses from this psalm, as at the Easter Vigil and at Masses for the Dead.

Book of Common Prayer
In the Church of England's Book of Common Prayer, the text begins "Like as a hart". The psalm is appointed to be read on the evening of the eighth day of the month.

Musical settings
Musical settings of the psalm include:

Classical
 Requiem by Ockeghem (15th century)
 E'en like the hunted hind: No. 5 from Tunes for Archbishop Parker's Psalter by Thomas Tallis (1567)
 Sicut cervus by Giovanni Pierluigi da Palestrina (16th century)
 Quemadmodum desiderat cervus by Dietrich Buxtehude (17th century)
 Loys Bourgeois used the tune for this psalm as a basis for the chorale tune 'Freu dich sehr o meine Seele'.
 Heinrich Schütz wrote a setting of a paraphrase in German, "Gleich wie ein Hirsch eilt mit Begier", SWV 139, for the Becker Psalter, published first in 1628.
 In the 17th century, Michel Richard Delalande used it for a grand motet.
 Marc-Antoine Charpentier set in 1679–1680, Quemadmodum desiderat servus H.174, for 3 voices, 2 treble instruments and continuo.
 Henry Desmarest set around 1700 un Grand Motet Quemadmodum desiderat servus.
 As pants the hart by Handel (18th century)
 Chorale Was betrübst du dich, movement 6 of Ich hatte viel Bekümmernis, BWV 21, by Johann Sebastian Bach (18th century)
 Psalm 42 by Mendelssohn (19th century)
 2e verset du 41me psaume (2e vt du 42e de la Vulgate) by Charles-Valentin Alkan (19th century)
 Like as the hart by Herbert Howells (20th century)
 As the Hart Panteth (Psalm 42) (1962, 1965; SATB 3' 20"), by Gloria Merle Huffman (1946–) (20th century)
 Psalm 42 (There is a longing in my heart) (1988; New International Version), by Maranatha! Singers (USA)
 Psalm 42 (As the deer pants for streams of water) (2008; New International Version), by Sons of Korah
 Sicut Cervus, 3-part a cappella piece by Laura Kranz
 Quemadmodum, a 6-part motet by John Taverner
 Psalm 42 by Tori Kelly
 "Like as the hart", setting the first seven verses from the Book of Common Prayer for choir a cappella, written by Judith Weir for the state funeral of Elizabeth II on 19 September 2022

Jewish
K'ayal ta'arog (As the hart pants, verses 2–3) is a popular Jewish song. An early Hasidic nigun was composed by the first Lubavitcher Rebbe, Rabbi Shneur Zalman of Liadi. The third Lubavitcher Rebbe, Rabbi Menachem Mendel Schneersohn (the Tzemach Tzedek) also composed a melody for it.

Notes

References

Further reading

External links 

 
 
 Text of Psalm 42 according to the 1928 Psalter
 Psalms Chapter 42 text in Hebrew and English, mechon-mamre.org
 Psalm 42 – The Assurance of those Who Trust in God text and detailed commentary, enduringword.com
 For the leader. A maskil of the Korahites. / As the deer longs for streams of water text and footnotes, usccb.org United States Conference of Catholic Bishops
 Psalm 42:1 introduction and text, biblestudytools.com
 Psalm 42 / As the deer longs for the water brooks, so longs my soul for you, O God. Church of England
 Psalm 42 at biblegateway.com
 Hymns for Psalm 42 hymnary.org
 Recording of a traditional Jewish melody for verses 2 and 3 on Zemirot Database

042